The 1875–76 season was the third Scottish football season in which Dumbarton competed at a national level.

Scottish Cup

The semi final of the Scottish Cup was reached for the second successive year before losing to 3rd LRV, after two 1-1 draws.

Friendlies

During the season, 7 'friendlies' matches were reported to have been played, of which 5 were won and 2 drawn, scoring 22 goals and conceding just 3.

Player statistics
Of note amongst those appearing in club colours for the first time this season was Peter Miller.

Only includes appearances and goals in competitive Scottish Cup matches.

Source:

Representative game
As part of the growth of the sport in Scotland, inter-county matches began to be an established part of the football calendar with the 'cream' of each county being selected to play for their respective counties/cities. One of the earliest was a match played at Hampden Park on 29 April 1876 between Dumbartonshire and Glasgow for the benefit of the Western Infirmary.  James Boyd and James Meikleham were selected from Dumbarton to play in the Dumbartonshire team, with Glasgow winning 2-0.

References

Dumbarton F.C. seasons
Scottish football clubs 1875–76 season